The 1981 Miami Hurricanes football team represented the University of Miami during the 1981 NCAA Division I-A football season. It was the Hurricanes' 56th season of football. The Hurricanes were led by third-year head coach Howard Schnellenberger and played their home games at the Orange Bowl. They finished the season 9–2 overall.

Schedule

Personnel

Roster

Starters

Offense

Defense

Coaching staff

Support staff

Game summaries

Penn State

at Florida St

Statistics

Passing

Rushing

Receiving

References

Miami
Miami Hurricanes football seasons
Miami Hurricanes football